Juan Canuti (died 1545) was a Roman Catholic prelate who served as Bishop of Cariati e Cerenzia (1535–1545) and Bishop of Carinola (1530–1535).

Biography
On 21 October 1530, Juan Canuti was appointed during the papacy of Pope Clement VII as Bishop of Carinola.
On 15 January 1535, he was appointed during the papacy of Pope Paul III as Bishop of Cariati e Cerenzia.
He served as Bishop of Cariati e Cerenzia until his death in 1545.

References

External links and additional sources
 (for Chronology of Bishops) 
 (for Chronology of Bishops) 
 (for Chronology of Bishops) 
 (for Chronology of Bishops) 

16th-century Italian Roman Catholic bishops
Bishops appointed by Pope Clement VII
Bishops appointed by Pope Paul III
1545 deaths